Constance Lalage "Lally" Katz (born ) is an American and Australian dramatist writing for theater, film, and television.  She now resides in Los Angeles.

Early life
Katz was born in New Jersey, United States. She was named for her aunt, Connie. When she was three she moved with her family to Miami, and then to Canberra when she was eight and three quarters. She moved to Melbourne when she was eighteen to attend university and pursue a career as a playwright. She graduated from the University of Melbourne’s School of Studies in Creative Arts. She trained with the Australian Theatre for Young People in 2000. She studied playwriting at London’s Royal Court Theatre.

Career
Katz began her career self producing her own plays in Melbourne, Australia when she was eighteen. From there she began to get commissions to write for Youth Theatre Companies such as St Martins Youth Theatre and PACT Youth Theatre. When she was twenty-three she joined Stuck Pigs Squealing Theatre Company.

Stuck Pigs Squealing Theatre produced a series of Katz's early plays: The Black Swan of Trespass which played at Malthouse, Belvoir and the New York International Fringe Festival where it won the Producer’s Choice Award after winning several Green Room Awards in Melbourne; THE EISTEDDFOD premiered in Melbourne at the Storeroom Theatre and transferred to Malthouse Theatre, Belvoir and PS 122 and Richard Foreman’s Ontological Hysteric Theatre in New York City, this production won the 2004 Best Independent Production Green Room Award.

After several successful shows with Stuck Pigs Squealing, Katz began to receive commissions from Australia's main-stage theatre companies.

In 2007 Katz co-wrote Criminology with Tom Wright, which was produced by Malthouse Theatre and Arena Theatre, and two short plays Waikiki Palace and Hip Hip Hooray formed a double bill premiering at Sydney Theatre Company that same year.

Katz’s adaptation of Frankenstein was directed by Ralph Myers at Sydney Theatre Company in 2008 and nominated for a Queensland Premier’s Award for Best Drama Script.

Goodbye New York, Goodbye Heart opened in New York in late 2010. The Apocalypse Bear Trilogy played at the Melbourne Theatre Company as part of the Melbourne International Arts Festival in 2009. Katz adapted stories from the bible for The Mysteries: Genesis at Sydney Theatre Company in 2008. When the Hunter Returns was commissioned and produced by The Gaiety School of Acting in Ireland and had a return season at the Dublin Theatre Festival. Her play Goodbye Vaudeville Charle Mudd premiered at Malthouse Theatre (co-produced by Arena Theatre) and won the Victorian Premier’s Literary Award for drama in 2009.

In 2011 she had three premieres on the main-stages of Australia: A Golem Story at Malthouse Theatre, Neighbourhood Watch at Belvoir and Return to Earth at Melbourne Theatre Company. Neighbourhood Watch was nominated for four Sydney Theatre Awards, including Best New Australian Work, Best Mainstage Production, Best Actress in a Leading Role in a Mainstage Production (Robyn Nevin) and Best Actress in a Supporting Role in a Mainstage Production (Kris McQuade). The play was also nominated for an AWGIE, a Helpmann Award and a NSW Premier’s Literary Award. A Golem Story won the Victorian Premier’s Literary Award and Return to Earth was nominated for a NSW Premier’s Award. "Neighbourhood Watch" remains on the high school reading syllabus.

Starchaser, a play for children, was produced by Arena Theatre in 2012 and performed at the Arts Centre Melbourne. It went on to win the Australian Writer's Guild Award for Best New Work for Young People.

In 2013 Katz’s one-woman show, Stories I Want to Tell You in Person, played to packed audiences at Belvoir and Malthouse Theatre. It later toured to Joe's Pub in New York, Mexico City and other cities in Australia before being adapted into a two part television series for the ABC starring Katz and Robyn Nevin.

In 2014 Katz adapted Henrick Ibsen's A Doll's House for La Boite Theatre Company and Brisbane Festival, directed by Steven Mitchell Wright to critical acclaim sweeping that years Matilda Awards.

In 2015 Lally's play "The Cat" was part of a sold out double bill with Brendan Cowell's "The Dog" at Belvoir in Sydney. She also wrote the libretto for "The Rabbits", composed by Kate Miller Heidke, which premiered in Perth Festival and then had sold out season in Melbourne and Sydney festivals, going on to win several Helpmann Awards, including the award for Best New Australian Work. It also won the Australian Writer's Guild Award for best libretto.

In 2017 "The Cat/The Dog" was remounted for another sold-out season at Belvoir. That year Katz had a premiere of her play "Minnie & Liraz" at Melbourne Theatre Company" and "Atlantis" at Belvoir in Sydney was a critical hit.

Katz participated in the attachment programme at the Studio at the National Theatre in London in 2009 and won a British Council Realise Your Dreams grant for 2010. She was a Churchill Fellow in 2010 and was appointed a Writer In Residence at Melbourne University in 2011.  In 2012 Lally won InStyle Magazine’s Women Of Style Award in the arts category and in 2013 she was the inaugural recipient of an Australian Writers’ Foundation Playwriting Grant.

Katz’s work for television includes adult one-hour dramas Wonderland, Wentworth and Spirited and children’s series The Elephant Princess. Stories I Want to Tell You in Person was adapted as a two part television series by the ABC in 2017, starring Katz and Robyn Nevin. She has also written for "Squinters" seasons one and two and for "Hit The Road" starring Jason Alexander.

Katz is currently adapting her play Neighbourhood Watch for the screen with Gillian Armstrong attached to direct and Marian Macgowan producing, developing a new play and television series with Windmill Theatre and working on several original television series.

Awards
The Eisteddfod won the Excellence in Direction and Producer's Choice awards at the 2004 New York International Fringe Festival.

The Black Swan of Trespass won awards for Excellence in Writing and Best Theatre Production from the Melbourne Fringe Festival, plus the Producer’s Choice Award from the New York International Fringe festival.

Her 2009 play, Goodbye Vaudeville, Charlie Mudd, was performed in the Beckett Theatre at the Malthouse and received the State Library of Victoria's Louis Esson Prize for Drama.

Works

Plays

Screenplays

TV Scripts

Personal life 
Katz dated John Safran. In February 2017, Katz married Christian Nardi in Las Vegas, U.S.

References

External links
 Lally Katz and the Terrible Mysteries of the Volcano
 Space to see things Interview

1978 births
Australian dramatists and playwrights
Living people
Helpmann Award winners